Executioners from Shaolin or Hung Hsi Kuan is a 1977 Shaw Brothers kung fu film based on the life of Hung hsi Kuan directed by Lau Kar-leung. It is released as Shaolin Executioners outside of Hong Kong and as Executioners of Death in North America.

The film is a multi-generational story of revenge pitting the disciples of Shaolin temple against the historical figure of Pai Mei, founder of Pai Mei kung fu.

Later, the movie was released on DVD by Dragon Dynasty.

Plot 
Opening crawl: "Having learned that the revolutionaries were using Shaolin Temple as an undercover, the Manchurian Count ordered Priest Pai Mei and his top disciple Kao Tsin Chung, Governor of Kwangtung and Kwangsi, to raid the shaolin Temple. They surrounded the Temple and set fire to it. In an attempt to rescue his disciples, Priest Chi Shan enter into a crucial duel with Priest Pai Mei."

The title scene is a battle between Pai Mei and Master Chi Shan in an empty red backdrop (this type of opening is a trademark of director Lau Kar-leung). Here we get the first display of Pai Mei's mastery of internal kung-fu techniques that allow him to retract his privates into his groin. After using his body protection techniques to ward off a clawing attack to the face, he traps a kick to the groin from Master Zhishan and delivers his own coup de grâce.

Master Zhishan's vision blurs as the scene changes to a more realistic scene of the aftermath of the temple's destruction. Pai Mei's protégé, area governor Kao Tsin-chung (Kong Do) and his army, chase the fleeing ex-students of Shao Lin. Tung Chin-chin, (Gordon Liu) after watching waves of other students fall to the pursuing army's arrows, makes a heroic last stand to divert their attention. He falls to a hail of arrows, crushing the throats of the soldiers he is closest to. It is left to Hung Hsi-Kuan to lead the remaining students to safety.

They join an itinerant opera group which travels from town to town on iconic red junks as a front for anti-Qing forces. Along the way he encounters the comely Wing Chun (Lily Li), herself a master of the Crane style. Together, they have a son, whom both of them train. When area governor and student of Pai Mei, orders the destruction of the red junks, the couple retreat to a modest home where they raise their son (Wen-Ding) and Hong begins mastering the Tiger style of kung fu in preparation for challenging Pai Mei.

After a decade of training, Hsi-Kuan goes to face Pai Mei, defeating several of his henchmen before retreating from his temple stronghold. Along the way, he discovers Pai Mei's weakness: he's vulnerable between one and three o' clock. Hung trains with renewed zeal on a sophisticated life-size bronze dummy fitted with grooves representing acupuncture meridians along its surface. By releasing a vessel in the head, metal balls cascade along these grooves so that he can snatch them to train his speed and accuracy. Still, he refuses to integrate his wife's Crane style, to his ultimate detriment.

In the final act, Hung goes to confront Pai Mei at his temple once again. He uses his training in vital point striking to catch Pai Mei off-guard. But again, he gets his foot trapped in Pai Mei's groin. Pai Mei tells Hung that he moves his vulnerable point up and down at will. After incapacitating Hung, Pai Mei tells the governor to keep him alive, only for Hung to kill the governor as he comes near. Pai Mei kills him with a swift but powerful blow.

Wen-Ding returns to avenge his father's death having been forced to synthesize his father's Tiger style with the crane style his mother taught him. Once again, he too lands in battle with Pai Mei, getting his foot trapped in Pai Mei's groin. But when Pai Mei goes to break Wen-Ding's leg, he jumps on Pai Mei's shoulders piggyback-style. Wen-Ding rips off Pai Mei's topknot, smashes him on the now unprotected crown of his head and, as his eyes are startled open, blinds him with a brutal dual jab in the eyes. They both tumble down the temple steps as the ending explains, "A combination of Tiger and Crane kung fu is what finally killed Pai Mei."

Reception 
Mark Pollard of Kung Fu Cinema calls the film an "essential old school classic", but the reviewer at LoveHKFilm.com says Executioners from Shaolin is "so-so".

References

External links 
 Executioners from Shaolin at Hong Kong Cinemagic
 
 

1977 films
1977 martial arts films
Hong Kong martial arts films
Shaw Brothers Studio films
Kung fu films
Films directed by Lau Kar-leung
Films set in 18th-century Qing dynasty
1970s Hong Kong films